Teradagawa Dam  is a rockfill dam located in Ishikawa Prefecture in Japan. The dam is used for irrigation and water supply. The catchment area of the dam is 2.3 km2. The dam impounds about 6  ha of land when full and can store 460 thousand cubic meters of water. The construction of the dam was started on 1996 and completed in 2007.

See also
List of dams in Japan

References

Dams in Ishikawa Prefecture